Henry Holt and Company is an American book-publishing company based in New York City. One of the oldest publishers in the United States, it was founded in 1866 by Henry Holt and Frederick Leypoldt. The company publishes in the fields of American and international fiction, biography, history, politics, science, psychology, health, and children's literature. In the U.S., it operates under Macmillan Publishers.

History

The company publishes under several imprints, including Metropolitan Books, Times Books, Owl Books, and Picador. It also publishes under the name of Holt Paperbacks.

The company has published works by renowned authors Erich Fromm, Paul Auster, Hilary Mantel, Robert Frost, Hermann Hesse, Norman Mailer, Herta Müller, Thomas Pynchon, Robert Louis Stevenson, Ivan Turgenev, and Noam Chomsky.

From 1951 to 1985, Holt published the magazine Field & Stream.

Holt merged with Rinehart & Company of New York and the John C. Winston Company of Philadelphia in 1960 to become Holt, Rinehart and Winston. The Wall Street Journal reported on March 1 that Holt stockholders had approved the merger, last of the three approvals. "Henry Holt is the surviving concern, but will be known as Holt, Rinehart, Winston, Inc."

CBS purchased the company in 1967, but in 1985, the group split, and the retail publishing arm, along with the Holt name, was sold to the Georg von Holtzbrinck Publishing Group based in Stuttgart, which has retained Holt as a subsidiary publishing under its original name and in the US it is part of Macmillan Publishers.

The educational publishing arm, which retained the Holt, Rinehart and Winston name, was sold to Harcourt.

Book series
 Amateur Studies
 American Science Series
 The American Presidents Series
 English Readings
 Holt Spoken Language Series
 Leisure Hour Series 
 Leisure Moment Series
 Library of Foreign Poetry
 The Makers of the Nineteenth Century (General editor: Basil Williams)

See also
Holt McDougal
Books in the United States

References

External links 

 
 Henry Holt and Company at the Internet Speculative Fiction Database
 

1866 establishments in New York (state)
Academic publishing companies
Book publishing companies based in New York (state)
Holtzbrinck Publishing Group
Publishing companies based in New York City
Publishing companies established in 1866
Publishing companies of the United States